Oil of Every Pearl's Un-Insides (stylized in all caps) is the only studio album by Scottish recording artist and producer SOPHIE. It was released on 15 June 2018, through Transgressive, Future Classic and Sophie's own label, MSMSMSM. According to one source, the title may be a variant spelling of the phrase "I love every person's insides". Oil of Every Pearl's Un-Insides was met with widespread acclaim by critics and received a nomination for the Best Dance/Electronic Album at the 61st Annual Grammy Awards. A remix album, Oil of Every Pearl's Un-Insides Non-Stop Remix Album, was released in July 2019.

Singles
In promotion of the album three singles were released off the album—"It's Okay to Cry", "Ponyboy", and "Faceshopping". The first single, "It's Okay to Cry", was released alongside a self-directed music video of Sophie, naked, singing directly to the camera in a studio setting behind digital skies and rainbow. The video marked Sophie's "first proper public appearance."

The second single, "Ponyboy", was released in December 2017. For its music video, Sophie worked with performance collective FlucT to choreograph "a dramatized ménage à trois". The third and final single, "Faceshopping", deals with gender, beauty, and the body and features vocals by Cecile Believe. Its accompanying music video distorts 3D renderings of Sophie's face, intercut with strobing images.

Music 
The opening track "It's Okay to Cry" is a ballad that begins with Sophie softly and intimately singing with 1980s-style synthesizer arrangements, before the song intensifies and Sophie's vocals crescendo to a wail. It was Sophie's first song as a singer-songwriter, and its lyrics and music video were taken as Sophie publicly coming out as transgender. "Ponyboy" and "Faceshopping" are playfully aggressive and hyperactive tracks that make use of pitch shifting and have themes of transgender identity and transhumanism. Oil of Every Pearl's Un-Insides incorporates an eclectic array of genres and styles including avant-pop, industrial music, glitch music, electro, ambient, dance-pop, EDM, ambient house, industrial techno, drone, synth-pop, Eurodance, contemporary R&B and dream pop.

Critical reception

Oil of Every Pearls Un-Insides was met with universal acclaim upon release. At Metacritic, which assigns a standard rating out of 100 to reviews from professional publications, Oil of Every Pearl's Un-Insides received an average score of 86, based on 22 reviews, indicating "universal acclaim".

Writing for Pitchfork, Sasha Geffen praised the album as "sprawling and beautiful, while still keeping the disorienting, latex-pop feel of her fascinating production technique" and said that while Sophie's "early singles exhibited a keen feel for economy and a killer sense of humor, OIL makes a bid for transcendent beauty." Peter Boulos of Exclaim! said, "For all the praise that could be heaped on the bulk of Sophie's output, the best that comes to mind is that it sounds like no one else could have made Oil of Every Pearl's Un-Insides. This is the kind of music that, in 20 years, we may look back on as a pivotal point in changing the trajectory of the pop music sound."

Reviewing the album for AllMusic, Heather Phares compared it favorably to Sophie's preceding release Product, claiming "Sophie is never indecisive as she takes her sounds and concepts to extremes. Where Product felt like a collection of alien pop hits, Oil of Every Pearls Un-Insides abounds with interludes, passages, and major statements that allow her to dig deeper on the album's second half." Joe Rivers of Clash wrote, "Sophie manages to incorporate the personal without detracting from what set her apart in the first place, and it makes for a record that's as affecting as it is thrilling."

Accolades

Track listing

Banks was initially uncredited on the album. This has since been changed on most streaming platforms, due to the song containing prominent samples of her vocals from an unreleased collaboration with Sophie.

Personnel
Music
 Sophie – lead vocals (1–3, 6 and 9), background vocals, processed vocals (7), production and mixing
 Cecile Believe – lead vocals (2–5, 8 and 9), background vocals (1), processed vocals (7)
 Noonie Bao – vocals
 Banoffee – background vocals (8)
 Nick Harwood – vocals
 Benjamin Long – mixing, vocal engineering, studio engineering
 Kota Banks – sampled vocals (6)

Vocal performers were listed without specifying whether they were background or lead or which songs they appeared on.

Artwork
 Eric Wrenn – art direction
 Charlotte Wales – photography
 Julia Wagner – set design
 Coco Campbell – dress design
 Emily Schubert – design (dress design)
 B34 – design (textiles)
 Nick Harwood – creative direction
 Sophie – creative direction

Charts

Release history

References

External links
 Official Sophie website

2018 debut albums
Sophie (musician) albums
Transgressive Records albums
Albums produced by Sophie (musician)
Ambient albums by Scottish artists
Glitch (music) albums
Electronic dance music albums by Scottish artists
Bubblegum pop albums
Experimental pop albums
Transgender-related music
LGBT-related albums